Saint-Gabriel-de-Brandon is a municipality in the D'Autray Regional County Municipality in the Lanaudière region of Quebec, Canada.

History
The first settlers, mostly Irish and Scottish Loyalists, came around 1825 to the shores of Lake Maskinongé, where they formed a community that was known as Lake Maskinongé Settlement by 1827, and later as the Mission of Lac-Maskinongé. In 1837, the name Saint-Gabriel-du-Lac-Maskinongé came in use but was changed to Saint-Gabriel-de-Brandon in 1840. This name refers to the angel Gabriel and the geographic township of Brandon that was proclaimed in 1827 and in which it is located.

In 1851, the Parish of Saint-Gabriel-de-Brandon was founded and the post office opened that same year. In 1855, the parish municipality was established with the same name.

In 1892, the main settlement on Lake Maskinongé separated from the parish municipality and became the Village Municipality of Saint-Gabriel-de-Brandon (now known as the Town of Saint-Gabriel).

On June 14, 2014, Saint-Gabriel-de-Brandon changed from parish municipality to a (regular) municipality.

Demographics
Population trend:
 Population in 2011: 2679 (2006 to 2011 population change: -4.3%)
 Population in 2006: 2800
 Population in 2001: 2590
 Population in 1996: 2608
 Population in 1991: 2161

Private dwellings occupied by usual residents: 1181 (total dwellings: 1598)

Mother tongue:
 English as first language: 0.9%
 French as first language: 97.5%
 English and French as first language: 0.7%
 Other as first language: 0.9%

Education

The Commission scolaire des Samares operates francophone public schools:
 École secondaire Bermon

The Sir Wilfrid Laurier School Board operates anglophone public schools, including:
 Joliette Elementary School in Saint-Charles-Borromée
 Joliette High School in Joliette

See also
List of municipalities in Quebec

References

External links

Saint-Gabriel-de-Brandon - MRC d'Autray

Incorporated places in Lanaudière
Municipalities in Quebec